The Burry Port and Gwendraeth Valley Railway (BP&GV) numbers 4 Kidwelly and 5 Cwm Mawr were small  steam locomotives, originally built by the Avonside Engine Company in May 1903 and April 1905 respectively.

History
They belonged to a series of seven  locomotives numbered 1–7 built between 1900 and 1907 for the BP&GV to replace older locomotives; five were built by Avonside and two by Chapman & Furneaux, each of the seven being different from the others. The differences between nos. 4 and 5 were comparatively small: no. 5 had an extended smokebox, and was fitted with the vacuum brake.

They both passed to the Great Western Railway (GWR) in July 1922, which assigned them to Diagram A114 and renumbered them 2194 Kidwelly and 2195 Cwm Mawr. They were sent to Swindon for overhaul in July 1923 and November 1922, but did not return to traffic until February 1926. The rebuilds were shown on Diagram B22; virtually new boilers (GWR code YF) were provided, and the bunkers were extended. They were then sent to Weymouth, to work along the quayside lines, for which a warning bell was also fitted. No. 2195 Cwm Mawr was withdrawn in March 1939; it was reinstated, without its name, in December 1939, and then worked at Bristol and Swindon. No. 2194 Kidwelly left Weymouth in 1940, and then mostly worked at Taunton. Both passed to British Railways in 1948 but they were withdrawn in 1953 and neither was preserved.

Numbering

Modelling
Kits are available, in both 4 mm and 7 mm scales, from Agenoria Models.

See also
 Locomotives of the Great Western Railway

References

External links
 Rail UK database entry
 Agenoria Models

0-6-0ST locomotives
Avonside locomotives
Great Western Railway locomotives
Standard gauge steam locomotives of Great Britain
Scrapped locomotives